Israel Wilson Durham (24 October 1855 – 28 June 1909) was an American politician from Pennsylvania who served as a Republican member of the Pennsylvania Senate for the 6th district from 1897 to 1898 and the 2nd district from 1898 to 1899. He was a political boss of Philadelphia's 7th ward and also briefly the president and principal owner of the Philadelphia Phillies baseball team in 1909.

Early life
Durham was born in Philadelphia, Pennsylvania to Thomas and Jane Durham.   He received a public school education and briefly entered the cloth business with J.B. Ellison & Company.  He apprenticed to Silas Emory, a brick-layer for two years.  He later joined his father's flour dealer business as a buyer and salesman.

Career
From an early age he turned to politics, identifying himself with the Republican Party, then dominant in Philadelphia.

In 1885, he was elected police magistrate; he was re-elected in 1890. In 1897, he was elected to the Pennsylvania Senate from the 6th District to fill the unexpired term of Boies Penrose, who had risen to the United States Senate. He was a delegate to the Republican National Convention from Pennsylvania in 1900, 1904, and 1908. He was appointed state Insurance Commissioner by Governor William A. Stone, then re-appointed by Governor Samuel W. Pennypacker. He held this post until June 1, 1905, when he resigned to go West for his health. He abandoned his position as party leader in January 1906. He was re-elected to the state senate in 1908, to take the place of Senator Scott.

Durham was a political boss of Philadelphia's 7th ward and was influential in the selection of Philadelphia's mayor and most of the city government members.

In February 1909, he and a group of investors bought the Philadelphia Phillies National League Baseball Club, of which he served as president.

He died while in office on 28 June 1909 in Atlantic City, New Jersey. He was interred in Philadelphia's Mount Moriah Cemetery in Philadelphia.

Further reading

William Bayard Hale, "An Empire of Illusion and its Fall", Leslie's Monthly Magazine (later American Illustrated Magazine), Vol. 60, no. 4, pp. 451–459, Colver Publishing House, 1905.

References

External links
Biographical information at MountMoriah.info

1855 births
1909 deaths
19th-century American politicians
20th-century American politicians
American political bosses from Pennsylvania
Burials at Mount Moriah Cemetery (Philadelphia)
Politicians from Philadelphia
Republican Party Pennsylvania state senators
Philadelphia Phillies owners